Epanaphe moloneyi is a moth in the family of Notodontidae that is found in Africa. The species was first described by Herbert Druce in 1887.

Distribution
It is known from Cameroon, the Democratic Republic of the Congo, Ghana, the Gambia and Uganda.

Biology
Known host plants of this species are: Cassia species (Fabaceae), Triplochiton scleroxylon (Malvaceae), Rourea coccinea (Connaraceae). Albizia species, Bridelia micrantha, Ficus platyphylla, Isoberlinia doka, Macrolobium species, Pericopsis laxiflora and Senna siamea.

References

External links

Notodontidae
Insects of Cameroon
Insects of the Democratic Republic of the Congo
Insects of Uganda
Fauna of the Gambia
Moths of Africa